Cyril Briggs (24 November 1918 – 26 November 1998) was an English professional footballer who played as a central defender in the Football League.

References

1918 births
1998 deaths
Footballers from Salford
English footballers
Association football central defenders
Darwen F.C. players
Accrington Stanley F.C. (1891) players
Manchester United F.C. players
Southport F.C. players
Hyde United F.C. players
English Football League players